Tumbling River is a 1927 American silent Western film directed by Lewis Seiler, written by Jack Jungmeyer, and starring Tom Mix, Dorothy Dwan, William Conklin, Estella Essex, Elmo Billings, Edward Peil, Sr. and Wallace MacDonald. It was released on August 21, 1927, by Fox Film Corporation.

Cast
 Tom Mix as Tom Gieer
 Dorothy Dwan as Edna Barton
 William Conklin as Jim Barton
 Estella Essex as Eileen Barton 
 Elmo Billings as Kit Mason
 Edward Peil, Sr. as Roan Tibbets
 Wallace MacDonald as Keechie
 Buster Gardner as Cory
 Harry Gripp as Titus

Preservation status
 Currently the film is lost.

References

External links 
 

1927 films
Fox Film films
1927 Western (genre) films
Films directed by Lewis Seiler
American black-and-white films
Lost American films
Lost Western (genre) films
1927 lost films
Silent American Western (genre) films
1920s English-language films
1920s American films